Michał Chałbiński (born 16 October 1976 in Jastrzębie Zdrój) is a Polish former footballer.

Career
He was released from Piast Gliwice on 30 June 2011.

References

External links
 

1976 births
Living people
Polish footballers
Polish expatriate footballers
Zagłębie Lubin players
Odra Wodzisław Śląski players
Górnik Zabrze players
Association football forwards
SSV Jahn Regensburg players
RKS Radomsko players
Polonia Warsaw players
Piast Gliwice players
Ekstraklasa players
2. Bundesliga players
Expatriate footballers in Germany
Polish expatriate sportspeople in Germany
People from Jastrzębie-Zdrój
Sportspeople from Silesian Voivodeship